Cana's Voice is an American Christian music trio from the United States; which formed in 2016. They have released one studio album, This Changes Everything (2016), with StowTown Records.

Background
The trio are Ernie Haase & Signature Sound's Doug Anderson, Avalon's Jody McBrayer, and The Greenes' TaRanda Greene. They started recording music in 2016, when they signed to StowTown Records.

Music history
Their first studio album, This Changes Everything, was released on May 27, 2016, from StowTown Records.

Members
Current members
 Doug Anderson
 TaRanda Greene
 Jody McBrayer

Discography
Studio albums
 This Changes Everything (May 27, 2016, StowTown)
 Live at Champion Forest (2017, Provident)
 Don't Wanna Miss This (2019, Provident)

References

External links

American Christian musical groups
Musical groups established in 2016
Vocal trios
2016 establishments in the United States